The Cancello–Benevento railway is a railway line in Campania, Italy.

History 
The line was opened in several sections as it follows:
 Cancello–Nola on 3 June 1846
 Nola–Sarno on 17 January 1856
 Sarno–Mercato San Severino on 17 February 1861
 Mercato San Severino–Montoro on 1 August 1869
 Montoro–Avellino on 31 March 1879
 Avellino–Prata on 2 September 1886
 Prata–Benevento on 9 March 1891

See also 
 List of railway lines in Italy

References

Footnotes

Sources
 
 

Railway lines in Campania
Railway lines opened in 1891